Gerald George Snyder (July 21, 1929 – January 31, 2022) was an American infielder in Major League Baseball who played his entire career for the Washington Senators from 1952 to 1958. He was born in Jenks, Oklahoma.

Snyder started his career in 1946 with the Niagara Falls Frontiers of the Class C Middle Atlantic League. Obtained by the New York Yankees in 1947, he played for their farm teams during five minor league seasons. He was still a member of the Triple-A Kansas City Blues when he was traded to Washington on May 3, 1952, along with Jackie Jensen, Spec Shea and Archie Wilson in the same transaction that brought Irv Noren and Tom Upton to the Yankees.

While in Washington, Snyder provided infield support for Pete Runnels, Herb Plews and Eddie Yost, playing mainly at shortstop. His most productive season came in 1954, when he posted career-numbers in games (64), runs (17) and RBI (17), while hitting .234 (36-for-154). In 1956 he batted a career-high .270 with two home runs and 14 RBI. On July 18, 1955, Snyder participated in five double plays at second base to tie a then major league record. He also played in the Venezuelan league and appeared in the 1959 Caribbean Series.

In a seven-season career, Snyder was a .230 hitter (145-for-630) with three home runs and 47 RBI in 266 games, including 60 runs, 18 doubles, two triples and seven stolen bases.  He played 15 professional seasons, through 1961, and spent part of his final campaign as player-manager of the Macon Peaches of the Double-A Southern Association.

Snyder died in Houston, Texas, on January 31, 2022, at the age of 92.

References

Sources

Jerry Snyder - Baseballbiography.com
Retrosheet

1929 births
2022 deaths
Baseball players from Oklahoma
Beaumont Exporters players
Beaumont Roughnecks players
Chattanooga Lookouts players
Joplin Miners players
Kansas City Blues (baseball) players
Macon Peaches players
Major League Baseball shortstops
Miami Marlins (IL) players
Montreal Royals players
Omaha Dodgers players
People from Jenks, Oklahoma
Quincy Gems players
Washington Senators (1901–1960) players